Rashad Bernard "Roc" Carmichael (born September 9, 1988) is a former American football cornerback. He was drafted by the Houston Texans in the fourth round of the 2011 NFL Draft. He played college football at Virginia Tech.

Early years
Carmichael played high school football at Gwynn Park High School in Brandywine, Maryland.

College career
During his college career at Virginia Tech, Carmichael recorded 115 tackles (75 solos), 10 interceptions, 16 pass breakups, and 26 passes defended.

Professional career
Carmichael was selected in the fourth round as the 127th overall draft pick by the Houston Texans in the 2011 NFL Draft.

Carmichael was signed off of the Texans' practice squad by the Philadelphia Eagles on September 18, 2013. He was released by the Eagles on August 30, 2014, but re-signed in November of the same year. He was again released on December 9, 2014. On May 5, 2015, he was released by the Cardinals.

On May 11, 2017, Carmichael signed with the Winnipeg Blue Bombers of the Canadian Football League. He was moved to the suspended list on September 7, 2017, and his contract expired after the season.

References

External links
Houston Texans bio
Virginia Tech Hokies football bio

1988 births
Living people
Players of American football from North Carolina
American football cornerbacks
Virginia Tech Hokies football players
Houston Texans players
Philadelphia Eagles players
Arizona Cardinals players
People from Laurinburg, North Carolina
People from Brandywine, Maryland
Winnipeg Blue Bombers players